In Reference re Greenhouse Gas Pollution Pricing Act 2021 SCC 11, the Supreme Court of Canada ruled on 25 March 2021 that  the federal carbon pricing law is constitutional.

Background
In response to Canada's 2016 ratification of the Paris Agreement which set greenhouse gas emission reduction targets, the Canadian federal government under Prime Minister Justin Trudeau passed the Greenhouse Gas Pollution Pricing Act (GHGPPA), which came into effect on 21 June 2018, establishing national standards for a carbon price.

The province of Saskatchewan under Premier Scott Moe filed an appeal, and on 3 May 2019 the Court of Appeal for Saskatchewan ruled in favour of the federal government concluding that, GHGPPA is "not unconstitutional either in whole or in part." and was a legitimate exercise of federal power under peace, order, and good government" (POGG). Moe filed his appeal of the Saskatchewan decision to the Supreme Court of Canada on 31 May 2019.

Breakdown of the decision
The majority found the Act to be constitutional including Chief Justice Richard Wagner and Justices Rosalie Silberman Abella, Michael J. Moldaver, Andromache Karakatsanis, Sheilah L. Martin, and Nicholas Kasirer.

Justices Russell Brown and Malcolm Rowe dissented and Justice Suzanne Côté dissented in part.

Lower court rulings
The three lower court rulings include docket number 38663 heard in the Court of Appeal for Saskatchewan, docket number 38781 in the Court of Appeal for Ontario, docket number 39116 in the Court of Appeal of Alberta. The Ontario and Saskatchewan Courts upheld the legislation, while the Alberta Court found that it was unconstitutional.

Climate change is real
The Supreme Court said that "all of the parties agree that global climate change is real. It's caused by greenhouse gas emissions resulting from human activities and it poses a grave threat to the future of humanity."

See Also
List of Supreme Court of Canada cases (Wagner Court)

Notes and references

Notes

References

Supreme Court of Canada cases
Canadian federalism case law
Supreme Court of Canada reference question cases
2021 in Canadian case law